is a private arts university located in Kanan, Minamikawachi District, Osaka Prefecture, Japan. The university adopted the current name in 1966.

Notable teachers
Toshiyuki Hosokawa
Takeji Iwamiya
Kazuo Koike
Sadao Nakajima
Kazuki Ōmori
Go Nagai
Teruaki Georges Sumioka, Full Professor of Philosophy

Notable students
Takami Akai, illustrator
Hideaki Anno, animation and film director
Kiyohiko Azuma, manga author and illustrator
Arata Furuta, actor
Satoshi Hashimoto, voice actor
Tenpei Nakamura, pianist
Katsunori Ozaki, pianist
Kenjiro Hata, manga artist
Toshio Kakei, actor
Koji Kanemoto
Shinichiro Kimura, anime director
Toshiyuki Kita, furniture designer
Takashi Tezuka, video game designer at Nintendo
Yoshiaki Koizumi, video game designer at Nintendo
Koji Kondo, video game composer at Nintendo
Kenji Yamamoto, video game composer at Nintendo
Meimu
Masahiko Minami, anime producer
Range Murata, illustrator and designer
Ramo Nakajima
Akira Nishimori
Masami Okui
Yoshio Kashiguchi, clarinet
Masanori Sera, singer and actor
Ai Otsuka, singer
Junji Naoe, composer and music coordinator
Setsuji Satō
Kazuhiko Shimamoto, manga artist
Masamune Shirow, manga artist
Hiroshi Takano
Novala Takemoto
Fumito Ueda, director of Ico and Shadow of the Colossus
Kanako Urai, professional wrestler
Kazuyoshi Kumakiri, film director
Hiroyuki Yamaga, anime director and producer
Nobuhiro Yamashita, film director
Kentarō Yano, manga artist
Jownmakc, Bandes dessinées artist, filmmaker

References

External links
Osaka University of Arts

Education in Osaka
Private universities and colleges in Japan
Art schools in Japan
Osaka University of Arts
Kansai Collegiate American Football League
Kanan, Osaka